IMHS may refer to:

Indian Military Historical Society
Indianapolis Metropolitan High School
Institute for Metahuman Studies

See also
IMH (disambiguation)